Paule Robitaille is a Canadian politician, who was elected to the National Assembly of Quebec in the 2018 provincial election. She represented the electoral district of Bourassa-Sauvé as a member of the Quebec Liberal Party until 2022.

References

Living people
Quebec Liberal Party MNAs
Politicians from Montreal
Politicians from Quebec City
Women MNAs in Quebec
21st-century Canadian women politicians
Year of birth missing (living people)